Mustafabad , is a town and union council of Depalpur Tehsil in the Okara District of Punjab Province, Pakistan., it is located at 30°53'32N 73°29'56E and lies to the north-east of the district capital Okara.

References

Union councils of Okara District